Gerhart may refer to:

As a given name
 Gerhart Baum (born 1932), German politician and former Federal Minister of the Interior
 Gerhart Eisler (1897-1968), German communist politician
 Gerhart Friedlander (1916–2009), nuclear chemist who worked on the Manhattan Project
 Gerhart Hauptmann (1882–1946), German dramatist and Nobel Prize winner
 Gerhart Jander (1892–1961), German inorganic chemist
 Gerhart Lüders (1920–1995), German theoretical physicist
 Gerhart M. Riegner (1911-2001), sender of the Riegner Telegram (the first official communication of the planned Holocaust) and secretary-general of the World Jewish Congress
 Gerhart Schirmer (1913-2004), highly decorated German soldier of World War II

As a surname
 Bobby Gerhart (born 1958), U.S. racecar driver
 Edgar Gerhart (1923-1992), Canadian lawyer, judge and politician
 Emanuel Vogel Gerhart (1817-1904), U.S. minister of the German Reformed Church
 John K. Gerhart (1907-1981), U.S. Air Force general
 Klaus Gerhart (born 1965), U.S. erotic photographer
 Garth Gerhart (born 1988), U.S. football player
 Toby Gerhart (born 1987), U.S. baseball and football player
 Todd Gerhart (born 1962), U.S. football player

See also
Gerhard
Gerhardt
Gérard

Surnames from given names